Bishops of Vilnius (Vilna, Wilna, Wilno) diocese from 1388 and archdiocese (archdiocese of Vilnius) from 1925:

Auxiliary bishops

Cyprian Wiliński (Wiliski),  O.P.  (3 Mar 1572 – 1594) 
Nicolas Pac (Mikalojus Pacas)(Mikołaj Pac) (9 Sep 1602 – 29 Mar 1610) 
Abraham Wojna (Abraomas Voina) (25 May 1611 – 20 Jul 1626 Appointed, Bishop of Žemaičiai) 
Jerzy Tyszkiewicz (Jurgis Tiškevičius) (17 May 1627 – 19 Dec 1633 Appointed, Bishop of Žemaičiai) 
Stanislaw Nieborski  (12 Jun 1634 – 27 May 1644) 
Hieronim Wladysław Sanguszko, S.J. (12 Dec 1644 – 31 May 1655) 
Theodorus Skuminowicz (Skumin)  (12 Aug 1652 – 24 Sep 1668) 
Aleksander Kazimierz Sapieha  (2 Aug 1655 – 12 Jan 1660 Appointed, Bishop of Žemaičiai) 
Gothard Jan Tyzenhaus (Gotthard Johann von Tiesenhausen) (5 Apr 1661 – 17 Sep 1668)
Mikolaj Słupski  (3 Jun 1669 – 1691)
Vladislaus Silnicki  (15 Feb 1683 – 8 Feb 1692) 
Jonas Jeronimas Krišpinas  (30 Aug 1694 – 19 Sep 1695) 
Jan Mikolaj Zgierski  (2 Jan 1696 – 25 Jan 1706) 
Wojciech Izdebski  (18 Jun 1696 – 3 Nov 1702) 
Aleksander Mikolaj Horain  (15 Sep 1704 – 23 Dec 1711) 
Maciej Józef Ancuta  (1 Oct 1710 – 14 Jun 1717 Appointed, Coadjutor Bishop of Vilnius) 
Karol Piotr Pancerzyński  (5 Oct 1712 – 31 May 1721 Appointed, Bishop of Smoleńsk on 11 Sep 1724) 
Bogusław Korwin Gosiewski  (20 Apr 1722 – 29 Jan 1725) 
Georgius Casimirus Ancuta  (27 Sep 1723 – 26 Sep 1737)
Antoni Józef Żółkowski  (7 Dec 1744 – 19 Jan 1763) 
Tomasz Ignacy Zienkowicz  (21 Jul 1755 – 19 Nov 1781) 
Józef Kazimierz Kossakowski  (13 Mar 1775 – 17 Sep 1781 Appointed, Bishop of Inflanty) 
Jan Stefan Giedroyć  (22 Aug 1763 – 22 Apr 1765) 
Tadeusz Benedykt Feliks Towiański, O.F.M. Conv.  (1 Dec 1766 - ) 
Stanislaw Jan Siestrzencewicz Bohusz  (12 Jul 1773 – 11 Dec 1783) 
Franciszek Alojzy Junosza Gzowski  (23 Sep 1782 – 1786) 
Piotr Aleksander Samson Toczyłowski  (23 Sep 1782 – 14 Dec 1793) 
David Pilchowski  (1 Jun 1795 – 22 Dec 1803) 
Georges Połubiński  (27 Jun 1796 – 1801)
Ignacy Houwalt  (20 Aug 1804 – 5 May 1807) 
Andrzej Chołoniewski  (20 Aug 1804 – 1819) 
Nikodem Puzyna  (26 Sep 1814 – 22 Oct 1819) 
Tadeusz Kundzicz  (10 Jul 1815 – 15 Jan 1829) 
Andrzej Benedykt Kłągiewicz  (15 Mar 1830, Appointed Bishop of Vilnius)
Jan Cywiński  (17 Dec 1840 – 17 Nov 1846) 
Kazimierz Roch Dmochowski  (17 Dec 1840 – 3 Jul 1848) 
Kazimierz Mikolaj Michalkiewicz  (12 Jan 1923 – 16 Feb 1940) 
Mečislovas Reinys  (18 Jul 1940 – 8 Nov 1953) 
Władysław Suszyński  (19 Jan 1948 Appointed, Apostolic Administrator of Vilnius on 3 Jul 1968) 
Juozas Tunaitis  (8 May 1991 – 4 Mar 2010) 
Jonas Algimantas Boruta, S.J. (28 May 1997 – 5 Jan 2002) 
Edward Ozorowski (31 Jan 1979 – 5 Jun 1991) 
Arūnas Poniškaitis (5 Feb 2010)

References

 Vilnius
Bishops
Vilnius-related lists